Little Miss Nobody is a 1917 American silent drama film directed by Harry F. Millarde and starring Violet Mersereau, Clara Beyers and Helen Lindroth.

Cast
 Violet Mersereau as Bonnie
 Clara Beyers as Elinor Grenville
 Helen Lindroth as Charlotte Wharton
 Sidney Mason as Arthur Wharton
 Dean Raymond as George Grenville
 John Mackin as Bull Dorgan
 James O'Neill as Joe Gaskell
 Robert Clugston as Billy Hamilton
 Willis Baker as Dr. Morley

References

Bibliography
 Robert B. Connelly. The Silents: Silent Feature Films, 1910-36, Volume 40, Issue 2. December Press, 1998.

External links
 

1917 films
1917 drama films
1910s English-language films
American silent feature films
Silent American drama films
American black-and-white films
Universal Pictures films
Films directed by Harry F. Millarde
1910s American films